Innue Essipit is an Innu First Nation in Quebec, Canada. It owns one reserve named Essipit where one-third of its population live, located in the Côte-Nord region on the North shore of the Saint Lawrence River. This is one of the nine Innu communities in Quebec. In 2018, it had a total registered population of 756 members. It is part of the Mamuitun Tribal Council.

References

External links
 Official website
 First Nation Detail by Indigenous and Northern Affairs Canada

First Nations governments in Quebec
Innu